The 2012–13 season of the 3. Liga (also known as the Keno 10 3. liga for sponsorship reasons) was the twentieth season of the third-tier football league in Slovakia, since its establishment in 1993.

The league was composed of 32 teams divided into two groups of 16 teams each, whose teams were divided geographically (Western and Eastern). Teams only played other teams in their own division.

Keno 10 3. liga Západ 
Changes from last season

Team changes

To Keno 10 3. liga Západ
Promoted from Majstrovstvá regiónu
 PFK Piešťany
 FK Slovan Levice
 LP Domino

Relegated from 2. liga
 FC Petržalka 1898

From 3. liga Západ
Promoted to 2. liga
 FK Slovan Duslo Šaľa
 FC ŠTK 1914 Šamorín

Not registered to 3. liga Západ
 PŠC Pezinok
 FK Púchov

Locations

League table

Keno 10 3. liga Východ 
Changes from last season

Team changes

To Keno 10 3. liga Východ
Promoted from Majstrovstvá regiónu
 MŠK Fomat Martin
 ŠK Futura Humenné

Relegated from 2. liga
 FK LAFC Lučenec

From 3. liga Východ
Promoted to 2. liga
 Partizán Bardejov
 TJ Baník Ružiná

Relegated to Majstrovstvá regiónu
 MFK Lokomotíva Zvolen
 MFK Goral Stará Ľubovňa

Locations

League table

References

External links
 Slovak FA official site 

3
Slovak
3. Liga (Slovakia) seasons